The French Line is a 1953 American musical film starring Jane Russell made by RKO Radio Pictures, directed by Lloyd Bacon and produced by Edmund Grainger, with Howard Hughes as executive producer. The screenplay was by Mary Loos and Richard Sale, based on a story by Matty Kemp and Isabel Dawn. It was filmed in three strip technicolor and Dual strip polarized 3D during what many consider 3-D film's "golden era" of 1952-1954.

Gilbert Roland co-stars and Kim Novak makes her first film appearance.

Plot
Millionairess Mame Carson's (Jane Russell) oil empire spells trouble for her love life.  Men are either after her fortune or afraid of it. Her money-shy fiancé Phil Barton (Craig Stevens) has just given her the brush off.

A disappointed Mame heads for Paris on the French Line's Liberté with friend and fashion designer Annie Farrell (Mary McCarty). She swaps identities with Myrtle Brown (Joyce MacKenzie), one of Annie's models, hoping to find true love incognito.

Aboard ship, she falls in love with French playboy Pierre DuQuesne (Gilbert Roland) who, unbeknownst to Mame, has been hired by her zealous guardian Waco Mosby (Arthur Hunnicutt) to keep the fortune hunters at bay. Pierre professes his love for Mame. Is he sincere or is this just a ploy to gain access to her millions?  Silliness ensues interspersed with several musical numbers until Pierre's real intentions are revealed.

Cast
 Jane Russell as Mary "Mame" Carson 
 Gilbert Roland as Pierre DuQuesne 
 Arthur Hunnicutt as Waco Mosby 
 Mary McCarty as Annie Farrell 
 Joyce MacKenzie as Myrtle Brown
 Paula Corday as Celeste 
 Scott Elliott as Bill Harris 
 Craig Stevens as Phil Barton 
 Laura Elliot as Kate Hodges 
 Steven Geray as François, ship steward 
 John Wengraf as Commodore Renard 
 Michael St. Angel as George Hodges 
 Barbara Darrow as Donna Adams 
 Barbara Dobbins as Kitty Lee 
 Jean Moorhead as Model
 Dolores Michaels as Model 
 Ellye Marshall as Model 
 Kim Novak as Model
 Pat Sheehan as Model
 Lane Bradford as Cowboy
 George D. Wallace as Cowboy
 Nick Stuart as Reporter
 Charles Smith as Reporter
 Bess Flowers as Farellie Saleslady 
 Theresa Harris as Clare
 Sue Casey as Showgirl
 Gloria Pall as Showgirl 
 Joyce Johnson as Showgirl
 Joi Lansing as Showgirl
 Sandy Descher as Janie
 Shirley Patterson as Elsie
 Anne Ford as Paris Model
 Fritz Feld as French Cabbie

Production
The French Line captures Russell at the height of her career, the year after Gentlemen Prefer Blondes, in a splashy musical comedy specializing in costumes so purposely skimpy that it received a "condemned" rating from the Catholic National Legion of Decency. The outrageous outfits were designed by Howard Hughes and the craftsmen at RKO to display Russell's physique to best advantage. Russell's singing, dancing, and comedic skills are also much in evidence. The film was considered scandalous at the time.

Controversy
Producer Howard Hughes was no stranger to controversy, especially when it came to Jane Russell.  His focus on Jane's cleavage in The Outlaw ran afoul of The Production Code in 1941. The film was held up until 1943 before it was finally given a limited release.
The French Line had its own set of controversies.  Jane's ample bosom literally popped out of the screen in 3-D. To stress the point Howard used the tagline "J.R. in 3D.  It'll knock both your eyes out!" as part of the advertising campaign. He also added the raunchy song and dance number "Lookin' for Trouble" performed by Jane in a revealing one-piece outfit with three strategically placed cutouts.

The Breen Office refused to give the film a Production Code seal of approval, branding it "offensive" because of "indecent exposure" during the soon-to-be notorious dance number. Hughes defiantly arranged for the film to premiere at the Fox Theatre  in St. Louis on December 29, 1953 without the seal. Russell refused to attend the premiere or do a publicity tour for the film, telling the press that "I certainly don't want to be associated with any picture that's denied the seal." RKO was fined $25,000 for advertising and exhibiting the film with neither the Production Code seal nor the approval of the film industry's Advertising Advisory Council, and the Archbishop of St. Louis Joseph Ritter forbade Catholics "under penalty of mortal sin" from seeing the film. Nevertheless, the film sold over 60,000 tickets in the first five days of its St. Louis engagement.

On January 9, 1954, RKO announced it would withdraw the film in nine days, in the meantime submitting a new cut to the Breen Office in the hopes of getting certified. When the Office still refused to approve the film RKO decided to keep it in theaters, and the Catholic National Legion of Decency graded the film Class C or "Condemned" as a consequence. The film was banned in Chicago and Boston, and was only released in New York, Pennsylvania, Maryland, Kansas and Detroit after part of the offending dance number was edited out.

After the initial run Hughes re-released the edited version of the film flat (without the 3D process).  Advertising changed the tagline to  "THAT Picture!  THAT Dance! -- you've heard so much about!"  The publicity surrounding the film guaranteed a success for both versions.

Reception
Reviews were mostly negative. Bosley Crowther of The New York Times slammed the film as a "cheap, exhibitionistic thing in which even the elaboration of the feminine figure eventually becomes grotesque ... To say any more about the cheapness and obviousness of this R. K. O. film would be but to give it more attention. And that it most certainly does not deserve." Variety called it "a rather mild, gabby fashion parade in 3-D" with "little of the imaginative" in the direction or screenplay. Richard L. Coe of The Washington Post wrote that "the essential sin of this half-baked dish is its dull, boring insistence. Since I am trying to forget the details as rapidly as possible, you will forgive me for not going into them specifically." The Los Angeles Times wrote, "As a romantic comedy with music, the film may be described as uninventively reminiscent of such predecessors as 'Gentlemen Prefer Blondes' and 'Roberta.' Even with an intermission it runs uncomfortably long." Harrison's Reports praised the "gorgeous" Technicolor but called the story "very weak, with the first three-fourths slow and uninspiring. It becomes lively in the model scenes in the last one-fourth, where flesh is displayed prominently, and in the dance sequences, where Miss Russell is tantalizing as she prances about in as scanty a costume as it is possible for a girl to wear." John McCarten of The New Yorker reported that he watched the film's 3D effects "with interest, if very little pleasure," and lamented that Mary McCarty was "grievously wasted on such trash." The Monthly Film Bulletin was somewhat kinder, writing that the script, "though low on comic situations, provides the star with some effective wisecracks and at least one number ('What is this I feel?') in which her comedy talent reveals itself as of a high order."

Among more recent assessments, Time Out London described the song-and-dance routines as looking like "out-takes from Gentlemen Prefer Blondes and How to Marry a Millionaire, and Craig Butler of AllMovie gave it one-and-a-half out of five stars, calling it "loud, garish and trashy -- but not so much so as to be more than intermittently fun and amusing."

3-D Films
 The French Line was filmed in RKO's own 3-D process which they titled "Future Dimension".
 Bwana Devil - 1952 is often credited as the first 3-D film.
 Recent advances in 3-D films including IMAX 3-D and 3D are opening a new era of 3-D filmmaking.
 For an extensive index of 3D films see List of 3D films.

Availability
 The only known surviving 3-D print of "The French Line" was screened at The World 3-D Expo 2006 September 15, 2006 at the Egyptian Theater in Hollywood, CA. The print included the very rare uncensored version of the "Lookin' for Trouble" number.
 Turner Home Entertainment released "The French Line" on VHS in 1989. Although the box claimed the print to be "The Original Studio Edition" it was the re-edited version with the censored "Lookin' for Trouble" number. The VHS has been out of print for several years. It periodically surfaces on various auction web sites.
 The Turner Classic Movie (TCM) cable channel occasionally shows the censored version on TV.
 ABC Television in Australia also occasionally airs the censored version.

References

External links
 
 
 
 

1953 films
1953 3D films
1953 musical films
1950s English-language films
RKO Pictures films
Films directed by Lloyd Bacon
Films scored by Walter Scharf
American musical films
American 3D films
1950s American films